Ravi Kiran Kola is an Indian film director and screenwriter who works in Telugu cinema. He's known for directing the film Raja Vaaru Rani Gaaru and screenwriting Ashoka Vanamlo Arjuna Kalyanam.

Career 
Ravi Kiran Kola was born in Bhadravaram village of East Godavari district and before making his directorial debut with Raja Vaaru Rani Gaaru, he made a couple of short films and did not undergo any film education or worked on a film set before. He went on to write story, screenplay, dialogues and showrun Ashoka Vanamlo Arjuna Kalyanam. He's currently working on an upcoming political thriller bankrolled by Matinee Entertainments

Filmography

References

External links 

 

Indian film directors
Living people
Telugu film directors
Film directors from Andhra Pradesh
People from East Godavari district
21st-century Indian film directors
Indian screenwriters
Telugu screenwriters
1994 births